TwoMorrows Publishing is a publisher of magazines about comic books, founded in 1994 by John and Pam Morrow out of their small advertising agency in Raleigh, North Carolina, United States. Its products also include books and DVDs.

List of magazines

TwoMorrows publishes the following magazines:

 Alter Ego
 Back Issue!
 BrickJournal
 Comic Book Creator
 Draw!
 Jack Kirby Collector
 RetroFan

Defunct magazines include

 Comic Book Artist
 Comicology
 Rough Stuff
 Write Now!

History

Jack Kirby Collector 
After the death of comics creator Jack Kirby, lifelong Kirby fan John Morrow and his wife Pam contacted Roz Kirby, the artist's widow, about an ongoing magazine devoted to her husband's work and legacy. She gave it her authorization.

Jack Kirby Collector was first published in limited quantities as a small, black-and-white magazine focusing on Kirby artwork and articles by Morrow and a few fellow collectors and fans. As each issue grew in size, it began to include rare or previously unpublished Kirby art, as well as uninked pencil versions of published art. Soon the magazine was being published on better paper, with glossy color covers. New and veteran comics artists were given the chance to ink reproductions of Kirby's original pencil work. Each issue carried the notation "Fully Authorized by the Kirby Estate". The magazine went on to be nominated for several awards. First issue was published September 5, 1994.

The Morrows launched fundraiser projects to fund the preservation of the thermostatic copies of Kirby's uninked pencils by scanning over 5,000 pages and cleaning them for future researchers and readers.

Other magazines 
Jack Kirby Collector contributor Jon B. Cooke approached the two Morrows about launching another magazine that would cover the comics of the 1960s and 1970s. This magazine, Comic Book Artist, launched under the TwoMorrows imprint in 1998 and would go on to win several Eisner Awards. TwoMorrows also picked up Comicology, a magazine devoted to current comics, and which lasted four issues.

TwoMorrows expanded again with a revival of former Marvel editor-in-chief Roy Thomas 1960s fanzine, Alter Ego — initially as a flip book with Comic Book Artist, then in 1999 as a standalone publication.

In 2001, TwoMorrows launched Draw! a magazine edited by animation and comics artist Mike Manley that centered on how-to and related articles for cartoonists and animators. At the same time, comics author and editor Danny Fingeroth started Write Now, a magazine of how to write comics and animation. In 2003, Jon B. Cooke left TwoMorrows to take Comic Book Artist to another publisher, Top Shelf Productions. The Morrows hired former comics writer and editor Michael Eury, author of the book Captain Action, to launch a successor publication. The new title, Back Issue!, debuted in 2003. Rough Stuff magazine, a spin-off of Back Issue!, focusing on previously unpublished penciled pages, preliminary sketches, detailed layouts and unused inked artwork debuted in July 2006.

Books and DVDs
TwoMorrows has also published several books devoted to comics and comic history. The first  was the Eisner Award-winning trade paperback Streetwise, a collection of autobiographical stories by such creators as Jack Kirby, Sergio Aragones,  Sam Glanzman, Murphy Anderson, and Nick Cardy. Others include The Warren Companion and The Fawcett Companion, chronicling the histories of the defunct publishers; Kimota! The Miracleman Companion, about the British comic book character; G-Force Animated: The Official  Battle of the Planets book, detailing the animated TV series; and three The All Star Companions by Roy Thomas, The Legion Companion, and The  Justice League Companion, and several other books devoted to Golden Age and Silver Age of comic books titles and heroes.

Along with books devoted to such artists as Murphy Anderson, Dick Giordano, George Tuska, Gene Colan, Wally Wood, and Kurt Schaffenberger, as well as to writer Alan Moore, TwoMorrows has published books about how comics are created,  such as Panel Discussions, Comics Above Ground, and Acting with a Pencil. Additionally, the company has published three collections of columns on comics by writer Mark Evanier; checklists of the works of Kirby and Wood; and the "Modern Masters" series by writer-editor Eric Nolan-Weathington.

In 2006, TwoMorrows expanded into DVDs by producing an art-instruction video, and a DVD version of the company's George Pérez Modern Masters book.

References

External links

Jack Kirby Museum & Research Center

Publishing companies established in 1994
Comic book publishing companies of the United States
Companies based in Raleigh, North Carolina
Book publishing companies based in North Carolina
Small press publishing companies
1994 establishments in North Carolina